Acleris tigricolor is a species of moth of the family Tortricidae. It is found in the Russian Far East (Ussuri) and Japan (Hokkaido, Honshu).

The wingspan is about 15 mm.

The larvae feed on Alnus species, Micromeles alnifolia and Carpinus laxiflora.

References

Moths described in 1900
tigricolor
Moths of Asia
Moths of Japan